Ralfs is a Latvian masculine given name. Individuals bearing the name Ralfs include:

Ralfs Eilands (born 1993), Latvian pop musician (PeR) 
Ralfs Freibergs (born 1991), Latvian ice hockey player
Ralfs Grīnbergs (born 1995), Latvian ice hockey player 
Ralfs Nemiro (born 1981), Latvian politician
Ralfs Sirmacis (born 1994), Latvian rally driver

References

Masculine given names
Latvian masculine given names